Orchis militaris, the military orchid, is a species of orchid native to Europe.  It is the type species of the genus Orchis.

Description 

This plant grows to a height of 20 to 50 cm with a robust stem with rather drawn up oblong basal leaves. The inflorescence forms a purplish dense cone consisting of from 10 to 40 flowers. In each flower the sepals and side petals are gathered together to form a  pointed "helmet" (whence it gets its name), a lilac colour outside and a veined purple colour inside. The central tongue finishes in two lobes separated by a tooth.

Depending on the location, it flowers from April to June.

Taxonomy 
Orchis militaris was first described by Carl Linnaeus in 1753. Orchis militaris Poir.. is a synonym of Orchis italica. Two subspecies are recognized:
Orchis militaris subsp. militaris – widespread in Eurasia, from Britain to Mongolia
Orchis militaris subsp. stevenii (Rchb.f.) B.Baumann, H.Baumann, R.Lorenz & Ruedi Peter – Iran, Crimea, North Caucasus, the Transcaucasus, Turkey

Distribution and habitat 
It is well distributed around Europe, reaching as far north as southern Sweden, but rather rare in the Mediterranean areas. It extends east across the Palearctic to Siberia. It prefers full light on a dry calcareous substrate, for example, unfertilized lawns, meadows, edges and light woods up to 2000 m in altitude.

It is extremely rare in Britain and a protected species, occurring only at the Rex Graham nature reserve in Suffolk and the Chiltern Hills in Buckinghamshire.

Uses 
Orchis militaris contains the nutritious polysaccharide glucomannan, and is one of the original species of orchid whose ground-up roots are used to make the drink salep.

Chemistry 
Orchinol is a phenanthrenoid that can be isolated from infected O. militaris.

References

External links

Military orchid (Orchis militaris)
Orchis militaris distribution 

militaris
Plants described in 1753
Taxa named by Carl Linnaeus
Orchids of Europe
Flora of Great Britain